Chhota Sa Ghar is a 1996 Hindi-language drama-film directed and written by Kalpataru, produced by Sushil Kumar Agrawal and the music is composed by Rajesh Roshan. Other crew roles are played by the various actors and screenwriters. It is screenplayed by Keshav Rathod, while the dialogues are written by Brij Katyal. It features Neelima Azeem, Asrani, Vivek Mushran, Devayani Jayadev, Koyal, Parikshat Sahni, Beena Banerjee, and Ajinkya Deo as lead characters. It is cinematographed by Madhav Kishan.

Cast
Vivek Mushran
 Devayani Jayadev
Parikshat Sahni
Beena Banerjee
Ajinkya Deo
Neelima Azeem
Asrani
Tiku Talsania
Ashok Saraf
Rajesh Khattar
Rubina
Sameer Khakhar
Salim Motu

Soundtrack
Tu Jhuth Bolta Hai - Kumar Sanu, Sadhana Sargam
Sorry Sorry Galati Ho Gayi - Kumar Sanu, Sadhana Sargam
Allah Jane - Kumar Sanu, Sadhana Sargam
Koi Bataye Ke Swarg Kaisa Hoga - Udit Narayan, Suhasini Nandgaonkar
Chal Mundia Mandir Main - Alka Yagnik
Parody - Sudesh Bhosle, Poornima

References

External links 

Indian drama films
1996 films
1990s Hindi-language films
1996 drama films
Hindi-language drama films